Gopalakrishnan Padmanabhan Pillai, better known by his stage name Dileep, is an Indian actor, producer, and businessman who predominantly works in the Malayalam film industry. He has acted in more than 150 films and has won several awards, including four Kerala State Film Awards and one Filmfare Awards South.

Beginning as an impressionist in stage shows, Dileep obtained recognition after being cast in the television comedy series Comicola on Asianet and its successor Cinemala. He then produced and performed in the audio cassette series De Maveli Kombathu with Nadirshah, a successful sketch comedy, which was later turned into a television series on Asianet. He began his film career as an assistant director and worked under director Kamal in nine films, beginning with Vishnulokam in 1991, and made his acting debut with a minor role in Kamal's Ennodu Ishtam Koodamo (1992). He acted in a principal role in the 1994 film Manathe Kottaram taking the screen name Dileep. He established himself as a successful actor during the late 1990s, mostly playing comedic roles. In 2003, Dileep founded the film production company Graand Production, its debut film was C.I.D. Moosa.

Outside of films, Dileep also owns the multiplex theatre D Cinemaas and the restaurant chain Dhe Puttu. Dileep was married to actress Manju Warrier from 1998 to 2015. He married actress Kavya Madhavan in 2016.

Early life

Dileep was born in Edavanakad, in Ernakulam district of Kerala, India to Padmanabhan Pillai and Sarojam. He is the eldest among three children. He has a brother, Anoop, and a sister, Sabitha. 

Dileep studied at Vidyadhiraja Vidya Bhavan Higher Secondary School in Aluva, where he passed the tenth standard in 1985, and joined the Union Christian College, Aluva for pre-degree (higher secondary) third group, during 1985–1987. Later, he pursued a degree in history at Maharaja's College, Ernakulam. It was during his time in Maharaja's College that he began taking impressionist acts (mimicry) seriously. Dileep along with his friend Nadirshah produced and performed (voice) in the Onam-based audio cassette (album) titled De Maveli Kombathu, which helped his entry into the film industry.

Career

1991–1999: Early years
Dileep started his career at Kalabhavan, working as a mimicry artist in the 1980s. He also performed in Asianet's comedy show Comicola. Later, while working as the assistant director to Kamal, he acted in a few small roles, starting with a small scene in Kamal's Ennodu Ishtam Koodamo (1992). Kamal recommended his name to many directors. He started using the name of the role Dileep in Manathe Kottaram (1994), as his screen name. Success of two 1996 films, Kamal's Ee Puzhayum Kadannu and Sundar Das' Sallapam, anchored his place in the Malayalam film industry. He played a supporting role in I. V. Sasi's Varnapakittu (1997). Punjabi House in 1998 marked the beginning of the successful Dileep-Harishree Ashokan combo.

2000–2009: Stardom

Ee Parakkum Thalika (2001) and Kuberan (2002) were a major success at box office and are considered two of the best movies in his career.

In 2002 he won the Kerala State Film Special Jury Award for playing the role of Kunjan in the film Kunjikoonan. In Lal Jose's Meesa Madhavan (2002), Dileep played the role of the thief Madhavan. This movie, which eventually developed a cult following was a major breakthrough in his career as it increased Dileep's stardom to a new level in Malayalam cinema. The same year he also debuted in Tamil cinema with Raajjiyam. C.I.D. Moosa (2003), a slapstick comedy by Johny Anthony is considered one of Dileep's career best movies by many fans. In 2004, he produced and starred in T. V. Chandran's Kadhavaseshan. He won a Special Mention for his performance in Chanthupottu (2005).

Dileep produced Joshiy-directed Twenty:20 (2008) to raise funds for the Association of Malayalam Movie Artists (AMMA). The film became the highest-grossing Malayalam film ( 31.4 crore) until that time.

2010–present

He ventured into production with Malarvaadi Arts Club. Kaaryasthan (2010) was his 100th movie, For his role in Vellaripravinte Changathi (2011) he won a Kerala State Film Award for Best Actor. "Two Countries" released on Christmas Day 2015, directed by Shafi, became the highest-grossing film in his career. His 2017 film, Ramaleela, became one of the highest-grossing Malayalam films of all time.

After a break, in the movie Keshu Ee Veedinte Nadhan (transl. Keshu is the lord of this house) Dileep comes to the screen in the titular role along with Urvashi. 
The film was originally scheduled for a theatrical release but was cancelled due to the COVID-19 pandemic in India.

Personal life

Dileep married actress Manju Warrier on 20 October 1998. The couple have a daughter born in 2000. In July 2014, the couple filed for divorce which was granted on 31 January 2015. On 25 November 2016, Dileep married actress Kavya Madhavan. The couple have a daughter born in 2018.

Off-screen work
Besides acting and film production, Dileep is also involved in film distribution (through Graand Production) and exhibition. He owns the multiplex theater complex D Cinemaas situated in Chalakudy. He along with his friend Nadirshah founded the restaurant chain Dhe Puttu, they have restaurants in Kochi, Kozhikode, Qatar and Dubai.

Sexual assault case 
On 28 June 2017, Dileep was interrogated by the Kerala Police in connection with the abduction and sexual assault of actress Bhavana on 17 February 2017. On 10 July 2017, Dileep was arrested by the Kerala Police for alleged conspiracy, and was remanded by the court. Following his arrest, Dileep's membership was revoked by various film organisations. Several political parties protested against Dileep and his business firms were vandalized, including Dhe Puttu restaurant and the multiplex theatre D Cinemas. On 3 October 2017, he was released on conditional bail by the Kerala High Court. In June 2018, he filed a petition in the Kerala High Court charging the Kerala Police of deliberately framing him. He requested the case be handed over to the Central Bureau of Investigation.

Dileep filed an additional plea for accessing video footage of the incident. The plea was denied by both the Angamaly Magistrate Court and the Kerala High Court. Mukul Rohatgi represented him in the case. In October 2018, Dileep was granted bail by the Kerala High Court. In April 2019, the Government of Kerala froze charges against him until the court has given an independent verdict on the case. In May 2019, the Supreme Court stayed his trial until his plea for footage is considered. On 30 November, the court turned down his plea, rather allowed to inspect its content, or have a second opinion as to whether the video is genuine.

In December 2021, film director Balachandra Kumar gave an interview to a news channel where he alleged that he was witness to discussions among people including Dileep, regarding turning witnesses hostile, attacking police officers leading the investigation and being in illegal possession of the assault video. He also claimed he had audio recordings of these conversations. Based on these claims, Kerala police registered a new case against Dileep for conspiracy to assault investigating officers. On 7 February 2022, he and others were granted anticipatory bail by Kerala High Court in conspiracy case.

Filmography

Playback singing

Awards
Kerala State Film Awards
 2011: Best Actor – Vellaripravinte Changathi
 2005: Special Mention – Chanthupottu
 2004: Second Best Film – Kathavasheshan (producer)
 2002: Special Jury Award – Kunjikoonan

Filmfare Awards South
 2002: Best Actor in Malayalam – Meesha Madhavan

Asianet Film Awards
 2002: Best Actor – Kunjikoonan
 2004: Special Jury Award – Kathavasheshan
 2008: Best Film – Twenty:20
 2010: Most Popular Actor – Body Guard 
 2013: Award of Excellence for completing 20 years in Malayalam film industry

Kerala Film Critics Association Awards
 2001: Best Supporting Actor-Joker
 2004: Best Actor – Kadhavaseshan
 2005: Best Actor – Chanthupottu

South Indian International Movie Awards
 2014: Best Actor – Sound Thoma

Vanitha Film Awards
 2013: Best Popular Actor

Jaihind Film Awards

 2010: Most Popular Actor Award
 2011: Chalachitra Pratibha Award
 2012: Best Actor – Mayamohini, Arike
 2013: Most Popular Actor Award
 2014: Most Popular Actor Award

Amrita Film Awards

 2010: Most Popular Actor Award

References

External links

 

Living people
20th-century Indian film directors
20th-century Indian male actors
21st-century Indian male actors
Film directors from Kochi
Film producers from Kochi
Filmfare Awards South winners
Indian male film actors
Kerala State Film Award winners
Maharaja's College, Ernakulam alumni
Malayalam film producers
Malayalam comedians
Male actors from Kochi
Male actors in Malayalam cinema
People from Aluva
South Indian International Movie Awards winners
Year of birth missing (living people)